Ericsson T39 was a GSM mobile phone released by Ericsson Mobile Communications in 2001, it was the follow-up to the T28 and T29.

The prototype, which was unveiled in 2000, was the second phone with built-in Bluetooth, while the first was Ericsson R520M.

Specifications 
 GSM Tri-band (900/1800/1900)
 Form Factor: Flip
 Weight: 86 g
 Screen: 101 × 54 px Monochrome LCD
 Bluetooth (1.0b)
 IrDA
 SMS, E-mail, WAP 1.2.1, GPRS, HSCSD

The T39 came in three different colour options; Classic Blue which was a dark blue, Icecap Blue which was a light blue, and Rose White which was a cream colour. The T39 was the last phone from Ericsson with an active flip and external antenna.

References

External links 
 Ericsson T39 full specification at GSMarena

T39
T39
Mobile phones introduced in 2000